Hazur Sahib, also known as Takht Sachkhand Sri Hazur Abchalnagar Sahib, is one of the five takhts in Sikhism. The gurdwara was built between 1832 and 1837 by  Maharaja Ranjit Singh (1780–1839). It is located on the banks of the Godavari River at the city of Nanded in the state of Maharashtra, India. 

The structure is built at the place where Guru Gobind Singh Ji left his earthly life. The gurdwara within the complex is known as Sach-Khand (Realm of Truth). The inner room of the gurdwara is called the Angitha Sahib and is built over the place where Guru Gobind Singh ji was cremated in 1708.

History

Hazur Sahib marks the site where Guru Gobind Singh ji had his camp in 1708. The Guru held his court and congregation here and was convalescing after being attacked by two would-be assassins. One of the attackers stabbed the Guru, and was killed by him with a single stroke of his talwar (curved sword). The other was killed by his followers as he tried to escape. The Guru's wound was deep, but initially healed after being stitched by an English surgeon sent by Bahadur Shah I, who served as his doctor, and Dara Shikoh before him.  However the wound re-opened a few days later when the Guru was stringing a bow for one of his Sikhs and the Guru merged into the Primal (Joti Jot) after declaring the Guru Granth Sahib as his successor.

The Sikhs built a room over the platform where Guru Gobind Singh Ji would sit while holding his court and installed Guru Granth Sahib Ji on it. They called it Takhat Sahib. Guru Gobind Singh Ji, while conferring Guruship to Guru Granth Sahib Ji, had himself named Nanded as "Abchalnagar" (literally "Steadfast city") after the first word of a hymn read at random on the occasion.

In October 2008, the 300th-anniversary celebration of the Guruship of Guru Granth Sahib ji took place here. This site is now one of five Takhats which are places of primary importance to the Sikhs. The other four takhats are: Sri Akal Takht Sahib at Amritsar, Takhat Sri Keshgarh Sahib at Anandpur, Takhat Sri Patna Sahib in Bihar and Takhat Sri Damdama Sahib in Talwandi Sabo, Bathinda, Punjab.

Sachkhand (literally "region of Truth") had been used by Guru Nanak Sahib Ji to mean the abode of God. Ranjit Singh had the present building of the Takhat Sahib constructed with money, artisans, and labor sent from Punjab during the early 1830s. Around the same time, the 3rd Nizam of Hyderabad Kingdom a Muslim ruler of the Deccan Region raised a contingent of Northern Sikhs as part of his army. Most of these men settled permanently in Hyderabad State and also few Hindus of the Deccan embraced Sikhism in the 19th century.

The control of Takhat Sachkhand Sri Hazoor Sahib, which had formerly passed into the hands of Udasi Sikh priests was regained by the Sikhs under the influence of the Singh Sabha Movement of the late nineteenth century. Some of the 'rituals and ceremonies connected with working' are peculiar to this Takhat Sahib. In 1956 an Act was passed by the legislature of Hyderabad under which the management of the Takhat Sahib and other historical Gurdwaras was legally placed under a 17-member Gurudwaras Board and a five-member Managing Committee.

The Takht houses both the Sri Guru Granth Sahib ji and the Sri Dasam Granth. This follows the pattern of Takht Sri Patna Sahib.

Nanded is the holy city where Baba Banda Singh Bahadur had his ashram and Baba Banda Singh started his journey of Khalsa victory; hence it has a very high regard in the history of India.

This shrine differs from other historical places of Sikh worship, here all ancient customs which were practised at the time of the Guru are still practiced, for example, sandal-wood tilak is still applied on the foreheads of priests and local devotees.

The most important aspect of this holy shrine is that there are two sanctum sanctorum here. While all the functions are carried out by the priests in the outer room, the inner room is a vault that houses priceless objects, weapons and other personal belongings of the Guru. No one except the head priest can enter this holy vault.

300th anniversary celebrations
In 2008, the 300th Gurudomship ceremony of Guru Granth Sahib and 300th Joti Jot anniversary of Guru Gobind Singh were celebrated on a grand scale at Hazoor Sahib, Nanded. The then Prime Minister of India, Manmohan Singh also addressed to the Sath-Sangat on the main event function. To publicize the event the "Jagriti Yatra" was arranged which travelled through different cities across the country and also some places in abroad.

Laser fountain show

Recently, a laser-ray show has been started at Gobind Bagh near the main gurdwara. In this show, the lives of the ten Gurus are briefly described. The show became very popular in a short period not only among Sikhs (local or visitors) but also people of other religions. It is the second largest laser show in Asia.

Historical gurdwaras in Nanded

Gurdwara Nagina Ghat Sahib
Gurdwara Banda Ghat Sahib (Baba  Banda singh Bahadur)
Gurdwara Shikaar Ghat Sahib 

Gurdwara Baoli Sahib (Nr. GURU Gobind singh Museum)

Gurdwara Heera Ghat

Gurdwara Mata Sahib

Gurdwara Maal Tekdi

Gurdwara Sangat Sahib

Gurdwara Damdama Sahib (Basmat Nagar, Parbhani)

Gurdwara Nanakpuri Sahib (place of Guru Nanak)

Gurudwara Bhajangarh Saheb

List of Jathedars

1. Bhai Santokh Singh (1709-1715)

2. Bhai Khushal Singh (1715-1722)

3. Bhai Laal Singh (1722-1730)

4. Bhai Bakhtawar Singh (1730-1736)

5. Bhai Charat Singh (1736-1786)

6. Bhai Mohar Singh (1786-1793)

7. Bhai Raam Singh (1793-1804)

8. Bhai Dharam Singh (1804-1812)

9. Bhai Charat Singh (1812-1817)

10. Bhai Sahib Singh (1817-1818)

11. Bhai Aaya Singh (1818-1824)

12. Bhai Jassa Singh (1824-1839)

13. Bhai Isher Singh (1839-1841)

14. Bhai Waryam Singh (1841-1844)

15. Bhai Tara Singh (1844-1858)

16. Bhai Atar Singh (1858-1867)

17. Bhai Prem Singh (1867-1875)

18. Bhai Deva Singh (1875-1876)

19. Bhai Brij Singh (1876-1877)

20. Bhai Jawahar Singh (1877-1883)

21. Bhai Naanu Singh (1883-1890)

22. Bhai Maan Singh (1890-1913)

23. Bhai Daya Singh (1913-1914)

24. Bhai Hari Singh (1914-1919)

25. Bhai Hira Singh (1919-1945)

26. Bhai Bahadur Singh (1945-1946)

27. Bhai Hira Singh (1946-1950)

28. Bhai Harnaam Singh (1950-1956)

29. Bhai Joginder Singh (1956-1984)

30. Bhai Hajoora Singh (1984-2000)

31. Bhai Kulwant Singh (2000-Present)

Kirtan Maryada Ragis at Hazur Sahib
Bhai Jagat Singh (1917–1978) was an eminent Ragi who did Seva at the Takhat from AD 1934 to 1978 (till death).

Gallery

See also
 Tourism in Marathwada

Notes

References

Further reading
Nidar Singh Nihang and Parmjit Singh, In the Master's Presence - The Sikhs of Hazoor Sahib, Kashi House (2009), .

External links
 Official website
 sgpc.net entry
 World Sikh News item on Deccan Sikhs

Sikh places
Sikh architecture
Nanded
Gurdwaras in Maharashtra
Religious tourism in India
Tourist attractions in Nanded district